Roger Lake (also called Rogers Lake or Rogers Pond) is a mountain pond located in a meadow on Aneroid Mountain in the Eagle Cap Wilderness of Northeastern Oregon, United States. It is listed as the 29th highest lake in the Eagle Cap Wilderness

Trail
Roger Lake can be accessed by either the East Fork Wallowa River Trailhead at Wallowa Lake or the Tenderfoot Trailhead. At  there is a small, well built bridge. The trail is usually very well maintained. It may be heavily traveled in the summer months.

References 

Lakes of Oregon
Lakes of Wallowa County, Oregon
Eagle Cap Wilderness